The mixed 300 m rifle three positions was an event at the 1972 Summer Olympics. This was the final time that free rifle was contested at the Olympics. Soviet shooter Boris Melnik was leading 1155 to 1154 when the unofficial scores were posted, but the official scoring brought American Lones Wigger up to 1155, Wigger won the tie breaker with a better score on the last string fired kneeling, 97, versus 96 for Melnik. It was the third consecutive victory in the event for the United States; the Soviet Union had taken at least one medal each of the six times it competed before the event was discontinued. Lajos Papp of Hungary took bronze.

Background

This was the 11th appearance of the 300 metre three-positions rifle event, which was held 11 times between 1900 and 1972. Three of the top 10 shooters from 1964 returned: silver medalist Valentin Kornev of the Soviet Union, eighth-place finisher Petre Șandor of Romania, and tenth-place finisher Lajos Papp of Hungary. Kornev was the reigning (1970) world champion.

Cuba, North Korea, Paraguay, and West Germany each made its debut in the event. Finland, Sweden, and the United States each made their 10th appearance, tied for most of all nations.

Competition format

The competition had each shooter fire 120 shots, 40 shots in each position (prone, standing, and kneeling). Shots were fired in series of 10. The target was 1 metre in diameter, with 10 scoring rings; targets were set at a distance of 300 metres. Thus, the maximum score possible was 1200 points. Any rifle could be used. All ties were broken by the best score on the final string of kneeling, if still tied the best score on the final string of standing, followed by prone.

Records

Prior to the competition, the existing world and Olympic records were as follows.

No new world or Olympic records were set during the competition.

Schedule

All times are Central European Time (UTC+1)

Results

References

External links
Official report pg. 232

Shooting at the 1972 Summer Olympics
Men's 300m 3 positions